Lake Péribonka is a freshwater body of the unorganized territory of Mont-Valin, Quebec, in Le Fjord-du-Saguenay Regional County Municipality, in the administrative region of Saguenay-Lac-Saint-Jean, in Quebec, Canada.

By the middle of the 19th century, forestry was the predominant economic activity of the sector. This large body of water is generally frozen from mid-November to the end of April; however, the period of safe ice traffic is usually from mid-December to the end of March.

Geography
It constitutes an important outgrowth of the river of the same name.

The main hydrographic slopes near Péribonka Lake are:
 west side: Serpent River, Brodeuse River, Épinette Rouge River, Mistassibi River Northeast; the lakes Maupertuis and Piraube;
 east side: Carp River, Cocoumenen River, Blaireau Creek and Cigale Creek, Little Shipshaw River, Manouane River. Note: the Pipmuacan Reservoir is located east of the Manouane River.

The Péribonka River arrives from the north by collecting the waters of Cocoumenen and Saint-Onge. It then crosses the Onistagane Lake Proposed Biodiversity Reserve. Lake Péribonka receives the waters of the Épinette Rouge River (West side) and the rivière à la Carpe (East side). Lake Péribonka has several dozen islands, peninsulas and bays.

During World War II, the Alcan company developed a hydroelectric plant on the Péribonka River to increase its electric power for aluminum production in Saguenay. Thus, the area of Lake Péribonka has increased significantly. This hydroelectric infrastructure is located at the southern end of this reservoir.

Toponymy
Formerly, this body of water was designated "Manouan" in native language, meaning "where we collect eggs". In 1987, all similar toponyms are replaced by the officialized place name. The Montagnais have also used the name "Unistakan Shakikan", meaning "lake where we get up with load on the back".

The toponym "Lake Péribonka" was formalized on December 18, 1986 at the Bank of Place Names of the Commission de toponymie du Québec.

See also
Lac Saint-Jean
Saguenay River

Notes and references 

Peribonka
Le Fjord-du-Saguenay Regional County Municipality
Maria-Chapdelaine Regional County Municipality